Robert Digges Wimberly Connor (September 26, 1878 – February 25, 1950) was an American historian who served as the first state archivist of North Carolina from 1907 to 1921, and later as the first Archivist of the United States from 1934 to 1941.

Life and career

Connor was born to Henry G. Connor and Kate Whitfield Connor on September 26, 1878, in Wilson, North Carolina. He graduated from the University of North Carolina at Chapel Hill in 1899. He married Sadie Hanes of Mocksville, North Carolina on December 23, 1902.

In his role as the inaugural secretary of the North Carolina Historical Commission, Connor lobbied the North Carolina General Assembly for a building and funding for what became the State Archives of North Carolina. He served as the first state archivist of North Carolina from 1907 to 1921.

Connor left the North Carolina Historical Commission to become the Kenan Professor of History and Government at the University of North Carolina at Chapel Hill. He held that position until 1934, when President Franklin D. Roosevelt appointed him to head the National Archives.

Connor served as the third president of the Society of American Archivists between 1941 and 1943.

He died on February 25, 1950.

References

External links
Connor in the Dictionary of North Carolina Biography
R.D.W. Connor Papers
North Carolina Collection
Time Magazine article from 1934
North Carolina Historical Marker

1878 births
1950 deaths
American archivists
American historians
National Archives and Records Administration
University of North Carolina at Chapel Hill alumni
People from Wilson, North Carolina
Presidents of the Society of American Archivists
Franklin D. Roosevelt administration personnel